Marie Josefina Mathilde Durocher (6 January 1809 – 25 December 1893) was a Brazilian obstetrician, midwife and physician. She was the first female doctor in Latin America.

Biography
Durocher was the daughter of French immigrants. She was born in Paris and moved to Brazil with her parents at the age of eight. Widowed young with two children, she was the first to be granted a medical degree from the newly founded Medical School of Rio de Janeiro in 1834.

Durocher was active in her profession for sixty years. She aroused attention with her habit of dressing in men's clothes, as she considered them more practical in her profession than the contemporary women's clothes. Midwife of the grandchildren of Emperor Pedro II of Brazil, Durocher became the first female member of the Academia Nacional de Medicina in 1871, and was the only woman in the Academy for 50 years.

References

Bibliography
 Jennifer S. Uglow : The Macmillan dictionary of women's biography (1982)
 Laura Lynn Windsor : Women in medicine: an encyclopedia

1809 births
1893 deaths
French emigrants to Brazil
Naturalized citizens of Brazil
Brazilian women physicians
Brazilian obstetricians
19th-century Brazilian physicians
19th-century women physicians